Morang District is located in Province No. 1 in eastern Nepal. It is an Outer Terai district. It borders with Bihar, India to the South, Jhapa to the East, Dhankuta and Panchthar to the North, and Sunsari to the west. Morang has one metropolitan city (Biratnagar), eight municipalities and eight rural municipalities. The lowest elevation point is 60 meters and the highest is 2410 meters above sea level.  The headquarters of Morang is connected by Koshi National Highway to the east–west Mahendra National Highway at Itahari, Sunsari, and Morang is also connected to the Hill parts of the eastern region of Nepal. Morang is the core industrial sector for the eastern region of Nepal.

At the beginning of the 7th century, King Mung Mawrong Hang came to prominence in the terai lands of Limbuwan (present-day Sunsari, Morang and Jhapa area). He cleared much of the forest area in present-day Rangeli, east of Biratnagar, and built a town there. He named his Kingdom Morang after his name and rose to power.

The lowlands of Limbuwan (present-day terai lands of Sunsari, Morang and Jhapa) was collectively known as Morang since the time of King Mawrong.In the beginning of 1400 AD, Morang Kingdom patriated from Kingdom of Ilam and Kingdom of Mikluk Bodhey (Choubise) and started ruling on its own. Morang Kingdom’s borders were set at Kankai river in the east, Koshi river in the west, Shanguri fort in the north and Jalal garh in India in the south. King Sangla Ing became the first king of Lowland Limbuwan kingdom of Morang after 900 years since it last had its own king. He built alliances with the other Kings of Limbuwan and remained in good terms. He built his kingdom at Varatappa and ruled from there. King Sangla Ing was succeeded by his son Pungla Ing, who later converted into Hinduism and changes his name to Amar Raya Ing.

Geography and climate 

Morang lies in the Outer Terai, or plains, of Eastern Nepal. Most of the land is taken up by rice and jute cultivation, though areas of sal forest remain along the northern part of the district where the plains meet the hills.

Demographics
At the time of the 2011 Nepal census, Morang District had a population of 965,370. Of these, 37.5% spoke Nepali, 23.7% Maithili, 6.0% Tharu, 3.8% Rajbanshi, 3.7% Limbu, 3.2% Urdu, 2.0% Rai, 2.0% Santali, 1.9% Angika, 1.9% Magar, 1.9% Tamang, 1.5% Newar, 1.3% Bhujel, 1.1% Dhimal, 0.9% Bantawa, 0.8% Bhojpuri, 0.7% Tajpuriya, 0.6% Hindi, 0.6% Rajasthani, 0.6% Uranw/Urau, 0.5% Chamling, 0.5% Gurung, 0.4% Bengali, 0.3% Magahi, 0.2% Ganagai, 0.2% Majhi, 0.2% Sampang, 0.2% Sunuwar, 0.1% Awadhi, 0.1% Danuwar, 0.1% Dumi, 0.1% Kulung, 0.1% Thulung, 0.1% Yakkha, 0.1% Yamphu and 0.3% other languages as their first language.

In terms of caste/ethnicity, 13.1% were Hill Brahmin, 12.0% Chhetri, 6.3% Tharu, 5.0% Rai, 4.7% Musalman, 4.2% Limbu, 3.9% Rajbanshi, 3.2% Newar, 3.0% Musahar, 2.8% Gangai, 2.7% Kewat, 2.6% Magar, 2.4% Tamang, 2.3% Bantar/Sardar, 2.2% Yadav, 2.0% Kami, 2.0% Satar/Santal, 1.6% Teli, 1.3% Damai/Dholi, 1.3% Khawas, 1.3% Mallaha, 1.2% Dhanuk, 1.2% Dhimal, 1.0% Marwadi, 1.0% other Terai, 0.9% Gurung, 0.8% Dusadh/Paswan/Pasi, 0.8% Halwai, 0.8% Nuniya, 0.7% Jhangad/Dhagar, 0.7% Majhi, 0.7% Sanyasi/Dasnami, 0.7% Sudhi, 0.7% Tajpuriya 0.6% Hajam/Thakur, 0.6% Kathabaniyan, 0.5% Koiri/Kushwaha, 0.5% Sarki, 0.4% Bengali, 0.4% Chamar/Harijan/Ram, 0.4% Gharti/Bhujel, 0.4% Kayastha, 0.3% Kalwar, 0.3% Rajput, 0.3% Sonar, 0.2% Badhaee, 0.2% Bin, 0.2% Terai Brahmin, 0.2% Danuwar, 0.2% Khatwe, 0.2% Kurmi, 0.2% Sarbaria, 0.2% Sunuwar, 0.2% Tatma/Tatwa, 0.2% Thakuri, 0.1% Amat, 0.1% Badi, 0.1% Bantawa, 0.1% Baraee, 0.1% other Dalit, 0.1% Dhobi, 0.1% Dom, 0.1% Kahar, 0.1% Kulung, 0.1% Kumal, 0.1% Kumhar, 0.1% Lohar, 0.1% Munda, 0.1% Punjabi/Sikh, 0.1% Rajbhar, 0.1% Sherpa, 0.1% Yakkha, 0.1% Yamphu and 0.4% others.

In terms of religion, 80.3% were Hindu, 6.5% Kirati, 4.7% Muslim, 4.1% Buddhist, 2.3% Prakriti, 1.6% Christian, 0.1% Jain and 0.3% others.

In terms of literacy, 70.5% could read and write, 2.0% could only read and 27.5% could neither read nor write.

Economy 
Most of the district is rural, though it is also home to Biratnagar, the sixth largest city of Nepal. It is the industrial capital of Nepal. Morang has the highest numbers of industries and factories, multinational brands. Other emerging towns include Urlabari, Biratchowk, Belbari, Khorsane, Pathari and Rangeli. It has the largest industrial area in the whole country, expanding from Rani Mills Area to Duhabi River. Biratnagar Jute Mills, Arihant and Dhanawat Matches are among the nation's oldest industries.

Education 
Morang district is home to the historic Morang Campus (Mahendra Morang Adarsh Multiple Campus, Biratnagar), Sukuna Multiple Campus (Sundar Haraicha Municipality), Urlabari Multiple Campus, Pathari Multiple Campus, and several other institutions of higher learning. Sukuna Multiple Campus has around 5000 students situated at Sunderharaincha of Morang district. Purbanchal University in Biratnagar offers graduate level courses in many disciplines of Science, Arts and Liberal Sciences. At present, the university has broadly identified Industry-Technology, Agriculture-Forestry, Environment- Rural-Cultural Subsistence and Sustainable Development as specific areas of “Academic Excellence”. It has affiliated private in all the parts of Nepal.

Politics 
Morang has been a hotbed of political activity throughout Nepal's recent history producing political stalwarts such as Matrika Prasad Koirala, BP Koirala, Madan Bhandari, Girija Prasad Koirala, Man Mohan Adhikari, Sushil Koirala, Bharat Mohan Adhikari as well as the present time leaders like Shekhar Koirala, Upendra Yadav, etc.

The district currently sends 6 members to the national legislature.

Administrative divisions
The district consists of one Metropolitan Cities, eight urban municipalities and eight rural municipalities. These are as follows:

Municipalities
Biratnagar Metropolitan City 
Sundar Haraicha Municipality
Belbari Municipality
Pathari-Sanischare Municipality
Urlabari Municipality
Rangeli Municipality
Letang Bhogateni Municipality
Ratuwamai Municipality
Sunawarshi Municipality

Rural Municipalities

Kerabari Rural Municipality
Miklajung Rural Municipality
Kanepokhari Rural Municipality
Budhiganga Rural Municipality
Gramthan Rural Municipality
Katahari Rural Municipality
Dhanpalthan Rural Municipality
Jahada Rural Municipality

Notable people
 Rekha Thapa, Actress
 Madan Bhandari, Political Leader
 Ghanashyam Khatiwada, Member of House of Representative, Morang 1
 Nikita Chandak, Miss Nepal 2017
 Yama Buddha, Rapper
 Shekhar Koirala, Member of Legislature Parliament of Nepal
 Shiva Maya Tumbahamphe, Member of House of Representative, 
 [Shiv Kumar Mandal] leader and House of Representative, Morang 5 (cpn maouist)
 Chhatraman Shrestha CTO of Need technosoft Pvt. Ltd.
Proportionate (CPN-UML)
 Lal Babu Pandit, Member of House of Representative, Morang 6

References

Further reading

 Shaha, Rishikesh (1992). Ancient and Medieval Nepal. Manohar Publications, New Delhi. .

External links

 

 
Districts of Nepal established during Rana regime or before
Districts of Koshi Province